Thomas Karaoglan (born 20 March 1993 in Duisburg) also known as Der Checker is a German singer from the label Ariola.

Biography

Early life
Karaoglan is of Armenian descent.

DSDS
He became popular from participating in the German casting show Deutschland sucht den Superstar, where he reached fifth place.

Performances

Post-DSDS
In July 2010, Karaoglan published his first single Checker, der Vollstrecker. 2011 Karaoglan published his second single called Diskoking. In addition to this, Karaoglan and his dance partner Sarah Latton took part at the German Dance-Show Let's Dance where they reached 3rd place. Karaoglan stated that he "make crap music" and started to design jewelry with Harald Glööckler. Karaoglan has been charged with two counts of sexually abusing a 12-year-old child in Münster, North Rhine-Westphalia. Karaoglan pleaded not guilty to the charges and the court case starts on 7 March 2013.

Discography

References

External links 
 
 Official website
 Short biography of Thomas Karaoglan

1993 births
Living people
People from Duisburg
German people of Armenian descent
21st-century German male singers
Deutschland sucht den Superstar participants